Christine Temple Whitman (née Todd; born September 26, 1946) is an American politician and author who served as the 50th governor of New Jersey from 1994 to 2001 and as Administrator of the Environmental Protection Agency in the administration of President George W. Bush from 2001 to 2003.

Born in New York City to a Republican political family, Whitman graduated from Wheaton College in 1968 and began her political career in the Nixon administration Office of Economic Opportunity. Before being elected Governor of New Jersey, she founded the Republican advocacy organization Committee for Responsible Government in 1993. , she is the only woman to have served as governor of New Jersey.

During the 2020 presidential election, Whitman endorsed Democratic nominee Joe Biden over Republican nominee Donald Trump. She is a co-founder and   co-chair of States United Democracy Center. In 2022, she joined former Democratic presidential candidate Andrew Yang to create the Forward Party, a centrist third party.

Early life and family background
Whitman was born Christine Temple Todd in New York City, the daughter of Eleanor Prentice Todd (née Schley) and businessman Webster B. Todd. Her parents were involved in Republican politics, and both the Todds and the Schleys were wealthy and prominent New Jersey political families. Her mother's family were among the first New Yorkers to move to what became Far Hills, New Jersey, which became a popular suburb for wealthy, moderate Republicans. Her maternal grandfather, Reeve Schley, was a member of Wolf's Head Society at Yale and the vice president of Chase Bank. He was also a longtime president of the Russian-American Chamber of Commerce.

Christine's father amassed a fortune from working as a building contractor on projects including Rockefeller Center and Radio City Music Hall. Webster used his wealth to donate to Republican politicians, and became an advisor to Dwight D. Eisenhower. Her mother Eleanor served as a Republican national committeewoman and led the New Jersey Federation of Republican Women.

Christine grew up on her family's farm, Pontefract, in Oldwick, New Jersey. On the farm, Christine grew up riding horses and fishing. She has three older siblings including her brothers, Webster and Danny. Her parents were politically active, taking Christine to her first political convention in 1956 for the renomination of Dwight D. Eisenhower. Her mother's political activity caused a newspaper to speculate that she could be a viable candidate for governor, although Eleanor never chose to run for office. As a child she attended Far Hills Country Day School before being sent to boarding school at Foxcroft in Virginia. Christine disliked being so far away from home and after a year transferred to the Chapin School in Manhattan, allowing her to return home on the weekends. After graduating from Wheaton College in 1968, earning a bachelor of arts degree in government, she worked for Nelson Rockefeller's presidential campaign.

Early career 
During the Nixon administration, Whitman worked for the Office of Economic Opportunity under Donald Rumsfeld. She conducted a national outreach tour for the Republican National Committee, was deputy director of the New York State Office in Washington, and worked on aging issues for the Nixon campaign and administration. Her husband, John Whitman, had a job with Citicorp that required the family to move to England for three years. When the family returned to the United States, Christine stayed home with the couple's two children, although she did remain active in Somerset County Republican politics.

Whitman was appointed to the board of trustees of Somerset County College (later renamed Raritan Valley Community College). Elected to two terms on the Somerset County Board of County Commissioners, she served as deputy director and director of the board. Among her accomplishments was the construction of a new county courthouse. From 1988 to 1990, she served as president of the New Jersey Board of Public Utilities under governor Thomas Kean.

In 1990, Whitman ran for the U.S. Senate against incumbent Bill Bradley, losing a close election. She was considered an underdog against the popular Bradley. During her campaign, Whitman criticized the income tax hike proposed by then governor James Florio. Bradley did not take a stance on the issue.

In 1993, Whitman helped to found the Committee for Responsible Government, an advocacy group espousing moderate positions in the Republican Party. In 1997, the CRG softened its pro-choice position, and renamed itself as the Republican Leadership Council.

Governor of New Jersey 

Whitman ran against incumbent James Florio for governor in 1993, and defeated him by one percentage point to become the first female governor in New Jersey history. She was the second woman and first Republican woman to defeat an incumbent governor in a general election, but was unable to gain a majority of the votes, winning by a plurality. Charges of suppression of minority votes were raised during the campaign. Two days after the election, Ed Rollins, Whitman's campaign manager, bragged about having spent $500,000 to suppress the black vote. Whitman denied Rollins's claim and demanded an apology and a retraction. An investigation into Rollins's claim found no wrongdoing.

Whitman pledged during the campaign that she would lower state taxes by 10% a year for three years. Once in office, she kept the campaign promise, and lowered income taxes. The decline in the tax burden made it likely that the issue of tax revenue shortfall would be addressed later. Jim Saxton, in a report to the federal congress, argued that New Jersey's income tax cuts improved "the well-being of the New Jersey family", and would not lead to an increase in property taxes. Saxton cited Tim Goodspeed's research and a recent paper published by the Manhattan Institute. He admitted that "a few localities raised [property] taxes", as expected by Goodspeed, but both Saxton and Goodspeed counted on the flypaper effect to mitigate any broad or persistent increases. However, the resulting long-term deficit could not be easily reversed, and subsequent governors ran into difficulties with the cumulative revenue losses and interest payments on the debt the state government issued.

In 1995, Whitman was criticized for saying that young African-American males sometimes played a game known as jewels in the crown, which she claimed had as its intent having as many children as possible out of wedlock. Whitman subsequently apologized, and voiced her opposition to attempts by Congressional Republicans to bar unwed teenage mothers from receiving welfare payments.

Also in 1995, the Republican Party selected Whitman to deliver the party's State of the Union response. She became the first woman to deliver a State of the Union response by herself; this was also the first State of the Union response given to a live audience.

In 1996, Whitman rejected the Advisory Council's recommendation to spend tax money on a needle exchange to reduce incidence of HIV infections.

Whitman was re-elected in 1997, narrowly defeating Jim McGreevey, the mayor of Woodbridge Township, who criticized Whitman's record on property taxes and automobile insurance rates. McGreevey also criticized Whitman for allowing a private sector company to administer the vehicle inspection program. In the 1997 election, the early prediction was that Whitman, as an incumbent, would have an easy win. The result, however, was that Whitman duplicated her 1993 election with only a one-point victory and a plurality of the votes. Murray Sabrin, a college professor who ran as a Libertarian candidate, and finished third with five percent of the vote, received votes mostly from conservative Republicans who might otherwise have voted for Whitman.

In 1997, she repealed the one percentage-point increase to the state sales tax that her predecessor Governor Florio had imposed, reducing the rate from 7% to 6%, instituted education reforms, and removed excise taxes on professional wrestling, which led the World Wrestling Federation to resume events in New Jersey. As a result, she was made honorary WWF Champion and awarded a replica belt by Gorilla Monsoon at that year's SummerSlam pay-per-view. In 1999, Whitman vetoed a bill that outlawed partial birth abortion. The veto was overridden, but the statute was subsequently declared unconstitutional by the judiciary. In 1999, she made a cameo appearance on the television show Law & Order: Special Victims Unit.

In 1999, Whitman fired Colonel Carl A. Williams, head of the New Jersey State Police, after he was quoted as saying that cocaine and marijuana traffickers were often members of minority groups, while the methamphetamine trade was controlled primarily by white biker gangs.

In 2000, under Whitman's leadership, New Jersey's violation of the federal one-hour air quality standard for ground level ozone dropped to 4 from 45 in 1988. Beach closings reached a record low, and the Natural Resources Defense Council recognized New Jersey for instituting the most comprehensive beach monitoring system in the country. New Jersey implemented a new watershed management program, and became a national leader in opening shellfish beds for harvesting. Whitman agreed to give tax money to owners of one million acres (4,000 km²) or more of open space and farmland in New Jersey.

When Democratic Senator Frank Lautenberg announced that he would not seek re-election in 2000, Whitman considered running, but ultimately decided not to.

According to The New York Times, Whitman "seemed to be on a short list of vice presidential candidates in 2000, right up until July 8, 2000 – days before the opening of the Republican National Convention in Philadelphia – when a four-year-old photograph surfaced showing an oddly smiling Governor Whitman, surrounded by law enforcement agents, frisking a black drug suspect on a street in Camden". 
In 1996, Whitman had joined a New Jersey State Police patrol in Camden, New Jersey. During the patrol, the officers stopped a 16-year-old African American male named Sherron Rolax and frisked him. The police did not find any contraband on Rolax's person, but Whitman frisked the youth as well. A state trooper photographed the act. In 2000, the image of the smiling governor frisking Rolax was published in newspapers statewide, drawing criticism from civil rights leaders who saw the incident as a violation of Rolax's civil rights and an endorsement of racial profiling by Whitman (especially since Rolax was not arrested or charged). Whitman later told the press that she regretted the incident, and pointed to her efforts in 1999 to oppose the New Jersey State Police force's racial profiling practices. In 2001, Rolax learned about the photograph and sued Whitman in federal court, claiming that the search was illegal and constituted an invasion of privacy. The appeals court agreed that the act did suggest "an intentional violation" of Rolax's rights, and that he "was detained and used for political purposes by his governor", but upheld the trial court's decision that it was too late to sue.

Ultimately, then-Republican presidential nominee George W. Bush selected Dick Cheney as his running mate in the 2000 presidential election.

Cabinet and administration

EPA Administrator 

Whitman was appointed by President George W. Bush as Administrator of the United States Environmental Protection Agency, taking office on January 31, 2001.

In the final weeks of the Clinton administration in January 2001, the administration ratified a new drinking water standard of 0.01 mg/L (10 parts per billion, or ppb) of arsenic, to take effect in January 2006. The old drinking water standard of 0.05 mg/L (equal to 50 ppb) arsenic had been in effect since 1942, and the EPA, since the late 1980s, had weighed the pros and cons of lowering the maximum contaminant level (MCL) of arsenic. The incoming Bush administration suspended the midnight regulation, but after months of research, the EPA approved the new 10 ppb arsenic standard to take effect in January 2006 as initially planned.

In 2001, the EPA produced a report detailing the expected effects of global warming in each state in the country. President Bush dismissed the report as the work of "the bureaucracy."

After the September 11 attacks in New York City, she appeared there twice to inform New Yorkers that the toxins released by the attacks posed no threat to their health. On September 18, the EPA released a report in which Whitman said, "Given the scope of the tragedy from last week, I am glad to reassure the people of New York and Washington, D.C. that their air is safe to breathe and their water is safe to drink." She also said, "The concentrations are such that they don't pose a health hazard...We're going to make sure everybody is safe."

In fact, the EPA was criticized for the outdated equipment used in collecting test data in Lower Manhattan - not because no better was available, but to support the official statements made (Stranahan, 2003 & Schneider and McCumber 2004). A 22-year veteran of the EPA and senior chemist reported that the available advanced technology found nine for each fiber detected with the outdated technology deployed by the EPA in Lower Manhattan after 9/11. USGS and NASA collected tests highly disputing the EPA findings in 2001 (Schneider 2004). Moreover, the NY City Department of Health published the data to the NY State Dept. of Health website to which EPA employees had access. In an apparent attempt to support the Whitman statement the EPA falsified the data to protect themselves from being sued. "They displayed absolutely no respect for health and safety of the public." (Markowitz and Rosner 2002). "What was being said to the press was not consistent with the hard facts, the data." (Peacock 2003).

However, a 2003 report by the EPA's Inspector General determined that the assurance was misleading, because the EPA "did not have sufficient data and analyses" to justify it.
A July 2003 report from the EPA Office of Solid Waste and Emergency Response provided extensive documentation supporting many of the inspector general's conclusions. The report further found that the White House had "convinced EPA to add reassuring statements and delete cautionary ones" by having the National Security Council control EPA communications after the September 11 attacks. On June 27, 2003, after having several public conflicts with the Bush administration, Whitman resigned.

In December 2007, legal proceedings began on the responsibility of government officials in the aftermath of the September 11, 2001 attacks. Whitman was among the defendants. The plaintiffs alleged that Whitman was at fault for saying that the downtown New York air was safe in the aftermath of the attacks.
In April 2008, the United States Court of Appeals for the Second Circuit overruled the district court, holding that as EPA administrator, Whitman could not be held liable for assuring the World Trade Center area residents that the air was safe for breathing after the buildings collapsed. The court ruled that Whitman had based her statement on contradictory information from President Bush. The U.S. Department of Justice had argued that holding the agency liable would establish a risky legal precedent because such holding would make public officials afraid of making public statements.

In an interview in 2007, Whitman stated that Vice President Dick Cheney's insistence on easing air pollution controls, not the personal reasons she cited at the time, led to her resignation. At the time, Cheney pushed the EPA to institute a new rule allowing power plants to make major alterations without installing costly new pollution controls. Whitman stepped down in protest against such demand by the White House, she said. She decided that because she did not agree with the rule, she would not be able to defend it if it were to be challenged in a legal action. The federal court eventually overturned the rule on the ground that it violated the Clean Air Act.

In 2016, Whitman apologized for the first time for her declaration a week after 9/11 that the air in lower Manhattan was safe to breathe.

Post-government career

Political activism 
In early 2005, Whitman released a book entitled It's My Party, Too: Taking Back the Republican Party... And Bringing the Country Together Again in which she criticizes the policies of the George W. Bush administration and its electoral strategy, which she views as divisive.

The last chapter of that book, entitled "A Time for Radical Moderates", speaks to radical centrists across the political spectrum. The same year as her book was released, Whitman formed a political action committee called It's My Party Too (IMP-PAC), to assist electoral campaigns of moderate Republicans at all levels of government. After the 2006 midterm elections, IMP-PAC was merged into RLC-PAC, the Republican Leadership Council's PAC.

Whitman runs the Whitman Strategy Group, an energy lobby organization which claims to be "a governmental relations consulting firm specializing in environmental and energy issues."

In 2011, Whitman was named to the board of Americans Elect.

In February 2013, Whitman supported legal recognition of same-sex marriage in an amicus brief to the U.S. Supreme Court.

As of 2015, Whitman is a member of the ReFormers Caucus of Issue One. The group, which included 100 other former elected officials advocated for campaign finance reform.

In 2016, Whitman was named the Co-Chair of the Joint Ocean Commission Initiative.

On February 26, 2016 she endorsed John Kasich in his bid seeking the GOP nomination for presidential candidate. She said that Donald Trump was using “fascist” tactics in his campaign and after Chris Christie's endorsement of Trump said that, in the case of a Trump nomination by the GOP, she would vote for Hillary Clinton. In 2018, Whitman wrote an op-ed calling Trump unfit for office and urging other Republicans to pressure him to step down.

In February 2020, Whitman endorsed former Massachusetts Governor Bill Weld for president in the Republican primaries, in which he was challenging incumbent president Donald Trump. Whitman spoke at the 2020 Democratic National Convention in support of the campaign of Democratic nominee Joe Biden.

Whitman was a co-founder of the States United Democracy Center in 2021 and serves today as its co-chair. In her States United capacity, she was among the former state officials who submitted testimony to the U.S. House of Representatives Select Committee to Investigate the January 6th Attack on the United States Capitol, arguing that the attack was part of "a sustained and coordinated effort by the former president and his anti-democracy allies to suppress voting rights, delegitimize free and fair elections, and subvert the will of the voters by overturning election results deemed undesirable to their movement." In July 2022, Whitman was among three former Republican governors who submitted a friend-of-the-court brief to the U.S. Supreme Court, urging the court to uphold provisions of the federal Voting Rights Acts of 1965 that protect minority voters from having their voting power diluted. With her States United co-founders, Joanna Lydgate and Norm Eisen, Whitman was a winner of the 2022 Brown Democracy Medal, given by the McCourtney Institute for Democracy at Pennsylvania State University.

Corporate activity 
Since 2003, Whitman has been on the board of directors of Texas Instruments and United Technologies. Whitman is also co-chair of the CASEnergy Coalition, and in 2007, voiced support for a stronger future role of nuclear power in the United States. Whitman joined the board of the American Security Project in April 2010. By 2015 she served as chairperson of the board of directors.

Personal life 
At a 1973 inaugural ball for Richard Nixon, Christine had her first date with John R. Whitman (1944-2015), an old friend she had met while a student at Chapin. The pair married the next year. Whitman was a businessman and an investment banker; he was also the grandson of early 20th-century Governor of New York Charles S. Whitman.

While governor, Whitman used Pontefract, the family farm on which she was raised, as her primary residence. Whitman had purchased the property in 1991 following the death of her mother.

With her late husband, Whitman has two children: daughter Kate and son Taylor. Kate has followed her mother into politics, including an unsuccessful run for the U.S. House of Representatives and having worked as a congressional aide. In 2007, Kate was named executive director of the Republican Leadership Council, her mother's organization which promotes moderate Republicanism. Whitman has seven grandchildren.

Whitman's hobbies have included mountain biking, playing football, and trapshooting. Whitman also had a Scottish Terrier named Coors (now deceased), who is the mother of former president George W. Bush's dog Barney.

Whitman has been a resident of Tewksbury Township, New Jersey.

Electoral history

See also

 EPA 9/11 pollution controversy
 Health effects arising from the September 11 attacks
 List of female governors in the United States

References

Markovitz, G. and D. Rosner.2002. "Deceit and Denial: The Deadly Politics of Industrial Pollution" Berkeley: University of California Press
Peacock, A. 2003. "Libby, Montana: Asbestos and the Deadly Silence of an American Corporation" Boulder, CO: Johnson Books
Schneider, A. and D. McCumber. 2004. "An Air That Kills: How the Asbestos Poisoning of Libby, Montana, Uncovered a National Scandal" New York: Berkley Books
Stranhan, S. 2003. "Air of Uncertainty" in American Journalism Review. January–February

Further reading
 Laura Flanders, Bushwomen

External links

 New Jersey Governor Christine Todd Whitman, National Governors Association
 
 biographical information for Christine Todd Whitman from The Political Graveyard
 Christine Todd Whitman brief bio
 Membership at the Council on Foreign Relations

|-

|-

|-

|-

|-

|-

1946 births
20th-century American politicians
20th-century American women politicians
21st-century American politicians
21st-century American women politicians
Administrators of the United States Environmental Protection Agency
American Presbyterians
American abortion-rights activists
Americans Elect people
Candidates in the 1990 United States elections
Centrism in the United States
Chapin School (Manhattan) alumni
George W. Bush administration cabinet members
Foxcroft School alumni
George W. Bush administration personnel
Republican Party governors of New Jersey
County commissioners in New Jersey
Living people
People from Far Hills, New Jersey
Politicians from New York City
People from Tewksbury Township, New Jersey
Radical centrist writers
State cabinet secretaries of New Jersey
Wheaton College (Massachusetts) alumni
Women in New Jersey politics
Women members of the Cabinet of the United States
Women state governors of the United States